Riverboat Gambler is a gambling themed pinball machine produced by Williams. Pinball machine designer Mark Ritchie reportedly sings the song that plays during the game, whose gravel-voiced, New Orleans-style male voice sounds similar to Louis Armstrong.

Description
In the center of the head of the machine, a vertical roulette wheel operates more like the Wheel of Fortune than an actual roulette wheel and does not have a ball. 7 of 16 sections are black, 7 are red, which alternate, with two green spaces that have stars on opposite sides. Located directly above the roulette wheel, a four digit display keeps track of virtual chips. The player uses chips earned on the playfield to bet on the roulette wheel.

There is an easter egg in the game. With game on, and ball at plunger, press and hold the Red and Black buttons, then press PASS 3 times, Black 3 times, Red 3 times, and Green 3 times. The display will shimmer, then press Black and Red together. The display will display "HELLO WORLD".

References

External links 
 

Williams pinball machines
1990 pinball machines